Quentin Dazeur (born 15 November 1991) is a French male canoeist who won 24 medals at senior level at the Wildwater Canoeing World Championships.

He won a Wildwater Canoeing World Cup in C1.

References

External links
 

1991 births
Living people
French male canoeists